Taylor's Wall is a 2001 television film directed by Craig Ross Jr., written by Cheryl McKay and starring Sam Doumit and Lukas Behnken.

Plot 
A teenage girl, whose brother was the second victim of two shootings on her campus, starts painting the wall in an attempt to end such school violence. The wall also becomes a point of healing and unity for the students as other students, friends of both the shooters and the victims, start helping Taylor paint the wall. A girl's despair...a teacher's challenge. Taylor wonders why her brother had to die. Her world no longer makes sense. Rebelling against the system, she is nearly suspended from school. A charismatic substitute teacher is her only hope. The teacher and his students share powerful journal entries and Taylor decides she can make a difference by finding a creative outlet for her pain. Taylor's brother, before his death, and eventually Taylor herself work to provide a solution to the root causes of random violence and other crimes committed by teens.

Cast

External links
Family Theater Productions

2001 television films
2001 films
American television films
Religious education
2000s English-language films